Stephen Dedman (born 1959) is an Australian author of dark fantasy and science fiction stories and novels.

Biography
Dedman's short stories have appeared in Year's Best Fantasy and Horror, Year's Best SF, and The Best Australian Science Fiction Writing: A Fifty Year Collection.

Contributing as a story editor, Dedman is also one of the team members behind Borderlands, a tri-annual Australian science fiction, fantasy and horror magazine published between 2003-2009 from Perth, Western Australia.

In 2007, he contributed to the Doctor Who short-story collection, Short Trips: Destination Prague.

Bibliography

Novels
 The Art of Arrow-Cutting (Tor Books, 1997)
 Shadows Bite (Tor, 2001) (sequel to The Art of Arrow-Cutting)
 Foreign Bodies (Tor, 1999)
 Shadowrun: A Fistful of Data (ROC, 2006).
 Shadowrun: For a Few Nuyen More (Catalyst Game Labs) 2021

Story collections
 The Lady of Situations (Ticonderoga Publications, 1999)
 Never Seen By Waking Eyes (Prime, 2005)
 Charm, Strangeness, Mass and Spin (Norstrilia Press, 2022)

Anthology contributions
 Black Box e-anthology (Brimstone Press, 2008)

Non-fiction works
 Bone Hunters: On the Trail of the Dinosaurs (Omnibus, 1998)
 May the Armed Forces Be With You: The Relationship Between Science Fiction and the United States Military (McFarland) 2016

Chapbooks
 The Dirty Little Unicorn (Self-published, 1987)

Short stories
"The Lady of Situations" (1994) in Little Deaths (ed. Ellen Datlow)
"Never Seen by Waking Eyes" (1996) in F&SF (ed. Kristine Kathryn Rusch)

"A Walk-On Part in the War" (1998) in Dreaming Down-Under (ed. Jack Dann and Janeen Webb)
"Honest Ghosts" (1999) in Gothic.net July 1999
"A Sentiment Open to Doubt" (2000) in Ticonderoga Online May 2000
"Probable Cause" (2001) in Orb Speculative Fiction No. 2 (ed. Sarah Endacott)
"Wastelands" (2002) in Agog! Fantastic Fiction
"Madly" (2003) in Southern Blood: New Australian Tales of the Supernatural (ed. Bill Congreve)
"The Wind Shall Blow For Ever Mair" (2003) in Gathering the Bones (ed. Ramsey Campbell, Jack Dann, Dennis Etchison)
"Twilight of the Idols" (2004) in Conqueror Fantastic (ed. Pamela Sargent)
"Dead of Winter" (2006) in Weird Tales March–April 2006 (ed. George H. Scithers, Darrell Schweitzer, John Gregory Betancourt)

"Empathy" (2008) in Exotic Gothic 2 (ed. Danel Olson)
"Wetwork" (2010) in Spells & Chrome (ed. Roc Books)
"Fall" (May 2012) in Exotic Gothic 4 (ed. Danel Olson)
"Large Friendly Letters" (2014) in Use Only As Directed (ed. Simon Petrie, Edwina Harvey)
"From Whom All Blessings Flow" Asimov's April 1995

Works edited
 Consensual (co-edited)
 Consensual: the Second Coming (co-edited)
 Consensual a trois. (co-edited)
 Borderlands Magazine

Awards
The Art of Arrow-Cutting was nominated for a Bram Stoker Award in the category of Best First Novel. In 1998 Dedman's "A Walk-On Part in the War" won the 1998 Aurealis Award for best fantasy short story. In 2001 "The Devotee" tied for the win with Terry Dowling's "The Saltimbanques" of the 2001 Ditmar Award for best short story. "Dead of Winter" won the 2006 Aurealis Award for best horror short story. Dedman has also received over 30 nominations for his work in awards such as the Aurealis Awards, Ditmar Awards, Gaylactic Spectrum Awards, the Bram Stoker Awards, and the Locus Awards.

References
Specific

General
 Mike Ashley & William G. Contento. The Supernatural Index: A Listing of Fantasy, Supernatural, Occult, Weird and Horror Anthologies. Westport, CT: Greenwood Press, 1995, p. 204
 Stephen Dedman official website bibliography
 Electricstory author bio

External links
 Bibliography
 Interview (2005)
 Teeth (Short Story), Clarkesworld Magazine
 Stephen Dedman answers The Usual Questions, Festivale Online Magazine

Australian fantasy writers
Australian horror writers
Australian science fiction writers
Australian male short story writers
Living people
1959 births